Vyron Pallis (1923 - 14 December 1995) was a Greek actor. He appeared in more than fifty films from 1948 to 1992.

Selected filmography

References

External links 

1923 births
1995 deaths
Greek male film actors
Male actors from Athens